Davos Seaworth, also known as the Onion Knight or Davos Shorthand, is a fictional character from the A Song of Ice and Fire series of epic fantasy novels by American writer George R. R. Martin, and its television adaptation Game of Thrones.   He is a prominent point of view character in the novels.

Davos first appears in 1998's A Clash of Kings and later in A Storm of Swords (2000) and A Dance with Dragons (2011), serving as Stannis Baratheon's most trusted counselor.  Davos comes from humble means and was a successful smuggler, who slipped through Targaryen loyalists' blockade to bring a shipful of much-needed supplies to Stannis and his starving forces defending the castle Storm's End during Robert's Rebellion.  As appreciation for saving his men, Stannis raised him up as a knight and a vassal lord, but personally cut off the fingertips of Davos' left hand to punish for the criminal career of smuggling. Davos considers the treatments fair and is stubbornly loyal to Stannis but fears the growing influence of the Red Priestess, Melisandre. He forms a close fatherly relationship with Stannis' disfigured daughter Shireen.

Davos is portrayed by Irish actor Liam Cunningham in the HBO television adaptation.

Character

Background
Davos is of low birth, being born to the life of a poor commoner in King's Landing's Flea Bottom.  In his youth, he became one of the most infamous smugglers of the Seven Kingdoms, often piloting his black-sailed ship into harbors in the dead of night, and navigated treacherous shallows.  He married a woman named Marya, with whom he had seven sons: Dale, Allard, Matthos, Maric, Devan, Stannis and Steffon.

At the time of Robert Baratheon's rebellion, Davos evaded the blockade of Shipbreaker Bay and smuggled a shipment of onions and salted fish into Storm's End to Stannis Baratheon and his men, who were starving under siege by Mace Tyrell and the Redwynes.  The food that Davos brought allowed Stannis's men to hold on for almost a year until Eddard Stark arrived to relieve the siege.  As a reward for this service, Stannis knighted Davos and awarded him nobility status with choice lands on Cape Wrath, for which Davos choose "Seaworth" as the name of his new house.  However, also as a punishment for his years of criminal activity as a smuggler, Stannis personally "shortened" Davos's left hand, cutting off the first joint from each finger.  Despite this, Davos found Stannis's ruling fair and just, and kept the bones of his severed fingertips in a pouch hung around his neck as a lucky charm.

Character
Davos is humble but very loyal to Stannis, due to the life and opportunities that Stannis' knighting him presented to Davos and his family, despite sometimes disagreeing with Stannis's methods. Davos is a devout believer in the Faith of the Seven, which puts him at odds with the Red Priestess, Melisandre, and the Queen's Men, who worship the eastern religion of R'hllor. Davos tries to always be honest with Stannis, speaking his mind instead of saying what Stannis wants to hear, which earns him Stannis' silent respect in return.

Storylines

A Clash of Kings 
Due to Joffrey Baratheon's illegitimacy, Stannis names himself heir to his brother King Robert Baratheon. Davos supports him, though he dislikes Stannis converting to R'hllor under the Red Priestess, Melisandre. Davos is sent to deliver letters declaring Queen Cersei's children were born of incest, so they cannot claim the Iron Throne.  However Stannis receives little assistance from other noble lords.

Davos sails with Stannis to besiege Storm's End when Stannis's younger brother Renly has also declared himself king and tries to defeat and kill Stannis but is killed by a "shadow" birthed by Melisandre. The castellan of Storm's End, Ser Cortnay Penrose, refuses to surrender Storm's End.  Davos advises attacking King's Landing before taking Storm's End, but Stannis fears that the stormlords will not follow him if he appears defeated. Davos personally escorts Melisandre, about whom he already has misgivings, into the caverns underneath Storm's End, where she births another "shadow" that assassinates Penrose and allows Stannis to claim Edric Storm, his illegitimate nephew via Robert.

Davos is given command of a ship at the Battle of the Blackwater, though he disagrees with their commander, Stannis's brother-in-law Ser Imry Florent.  Tyrion Lannister, who is Iron Throne's acting Hand of the King in charge of defending King's Landing, traps Stannis' vanguard fleet with a river chain and destroys much of them with wildfire.  Davos's four oldest sons are killed in the ambush, but Davos survives and is washed ashore on the seamounts known as the Spears of the Merling King, losing his "luck", and is eventually recovered by Stannis' men.

A Storm of Swords 
Blaming Melisandre for the loss (due to Tyrion's use of wildfire and Melisandre's religious associations with fire), Davos plots to murder the priestess. However, Melisandre foresees it and Davos is imprisoned by Stannis' uncle-in-law Ser Axell Florent, who also threatens to kill Davos if he does not help Axell become Stannis's Hand of the King. Imprisoned with Davos is Stannis' Hand and uncle-in-law Lord Alester Florent, who was imprisoned for trying to negotiate with the Lannisters behind Stannis' back.  Stannis releases Davos to hear his counsel on attacking Claw Isle, and Davos claims that it would be unjust to attack despite Lord Celtigar bending the knee to Joffrey, as its people are innocent and only following their Lord.  Pleased by his honesty, Stannis names Davos Hand of the King.  Davos then watches a ritual where Stannis uses blood leeched from Edric Storm to curse the three rival kings Joffrey Baratheon, Balon Greyjoy and Robb Stark. After Robb and Balon later die, Stannis and Melisandre consider sacrificing Edric to raise a rumored dragon sleeping under Dragonstone, despite Davos' objection. On hearing of Joffrey's death, Davos smuggles out Edric east to the Free Cities to protect him from Melisandre.

Learning to read, Davos comes across a plea for aid from the Night's Watch, and convinces Stannis to sail north and help defend the Wall against an invasion of wildlings fleeing the Others.  Atter Stannis makes port at Eastwatch-at-the-Sea to reinforce Castle Black, Davos is sent to White Harbor to persuade Lord Wyman Manderly, the wealthiest and second most powerful Northern lord, to support Stannis' war effort.

A Feast for Crows and A Dance With Dragons 
After being abandoned by the Lyseni sellsail Salladhor Saan, the escortless Davos manages to arrive at White Harbor after a much troubled journey, and discovers that the Manderlys are hosting three members of House Frey, who previously betrayed House Starks at the Red Wedding and massacred unarmed northmen loyal to Robb Stark, including Lord Wyman's younger son Ser Wendel Manderly.  Alone and disadvantaged, Davos nevertheless claims the North should support Stannis as he will give them vengeance, is imprisoned by Wyman.  Wyman then sends word to King's Landing that he has executed Davos as a show of fealty, but in reality executed a criminal vaguely resembling Davos.  Davos is kept imprisoned in the Wolf's Den but treated well, and is later released and taken to meet with Wyman in secrecy by Robett Glover, who is also Wyman's secret guest.  Wyman apologizes to Davos for the earlier reception and explains that he cannot publicly defy the Lannisters while his only surviving son and heir Ser Wylis is a captive at Harrenhal, but the fake execution has worked and Wylis is being returned home.  Wyman implies he plans to murder the three Freys, and reveals that many of the other Northern lords also wish to overthrow House Bolton, who has assumed control of the North after betraying House Stark, but dare not openly defy the Boltons unless a legitimate Stark heir can be found.  Wyman also reveals to Davos that he has been harboring Wex Pyke, Theon Greyjoy's mute squire, who is a hidden witness to Ramsay Snow's sacking of Winterfell and secretly followed the fleeing Rickon Stark and Osha, and points out that Rickon is on the fabled cannibal island of Skagos.  Wyman then tells Davos if he can successfully retrieve Rickon from Skagos, House Manderly will support Stannis' campaign.

TV adaptation

In the HBO series, Davos has the fingers taken from his right hand (as actor Liam Cunningham is left-handed). He references having multiple sons, but only one is seen or included in the story (Matthos).

Season 2 
When Renly refuses to surrender to Stannis, Davos is ordered to sail with Melisandre beneath Storm's End. When they reach shore, Davos is horrified when Melisandre gives birth to a shadowy demon, who kills Renly. The stormlords bend the knee to Stannis, who plans to launch a naval attack on King's Landing and gives Davos command of the fleet. As the Baratheon fleet arrives in Blackwater Bay, a ship filled with wildfire is detonated in the middle of the fleet; Davos's ship is one of the closest, and he is thrown into the sea when his ship is destroyed.

Season 3 
Davos is revealed to have survived by swimming to a rock, and is rescued by his friend, the pirate Salladhor Saan, who reveals that Matthos died during the Battle of the Blackwater. Grief-stricken by the death of his son, Davos blames Melisandre for Stannis's defeat and unsuccessfully tries to assassinate her before being thrown into the dungeons. During his captivity, Stannis's daughter Shireen discovers that Davos is illiterate and teaches him to read. Stannis eventually releases Davos, naming him as his hand. Soon after, Stannis and Melisandre plot to sacrifice Robert's bastard, Gendry, until Davos frees him and helps him escape Dragonstone. An enraged Stannis resolves to execute Davos, until Davos presents a letter from Castle Black warning of the White Walkers' return. Melisandre corroborates this and counsels Stannis that he will need Davos when the Long Night comes, thus prompting Stannis to pardon Davos.

Season 4 
After Joffrey Baratheon's death, Stannis reprimands Davos for not being able to secure more men. Davos arranges a meeting with Tycho Nestoris, a representative of the Iron Bank of Braavos, and persuades him to give their financial backing to Stannis instead. Davos uses the money to hire ships and sellswords and the Baratheon army travels to the Wall, defeating the wildling army besieging it.

Season 5 
Davos accompanies the Baratheon forces on their march to Winterfell. During their march, Ramsay Bolton and his men infiltrate the camp and destroy their supplies. Davos is sent back to the Wall to ask for more supplies, unaware that Stannis plans to sacrifice Shireen to assure his victory. Lord Commander Jon Snow, though sympathetic, is unable to offer help. Soon after, Melisandre arrives at Castle Black, having fled in the aftermath of Shireen's sacrifice. Davos realises that Stannis has been defeated and Shireen is dead, though Melisandre does not reveal her role.

Season 6 
Davos is the first to discover Jon Snow's body after his assassination, and barricades his body in a storeroom with the help of Jon's loyalists. After the wildlings imprison the mutineers who killed Jon, Davos persuades Melisandre to attempt a resurrection of Jon, which is ultimately successful. Jon's death releases him from his Night's Watch vows and he decides to gather allies to march with him on Winterfell. Davos accompanies him, and is able to convince the young Lady Lyanna Mormont to offer House Mormont's support, though few other houses do the same. During the army's march to Winterfell, Davos finds the remnants of a sacrificial pyre and the burnt remains of the wooden stag he had carved for Shireen as a gift and realises that she had been sacrificed by Melisandre. Davos initially keeps this revelation to himself, instead participating in the Stark loyalists' victory over the Bolton forces. After the battle has been won and Winterfell retaken, Davos confronts Melisandre. When Melisandre confesses to killing Shireen, Jon exiles her from the North and Davos threatens to execute her personally if she ever returns. Davos is later among the Northern and Vale lords who crown Jon as the King in the North.

Season 7 
Jon receives an invitation from Daenerys Targaryen to come to Dragonstone to bend the knee. Though apprehensive, Jon decides to go to obtain access to Dragonstone's dragonglass mines, taking Davos with him. There, Davos supports Jon's claim that the White Walkers have returned, whilst almost accidentally revealing Jon's resurrection in the process. Daenerys is unconvinced, but permits them to mine the dragonglass as a gesture of goodwill. Daenerys's advisor Tyrion Lannister suggests that Jon go beyond the Wall to capture a wight, to present to Queen Cersei Lannister as evidence of the White Walkers.

Davos smuggles Tyrion into King's Landing to arrange a meeting between Cersei, Daenerys and Jon after their return, while Davos seeks out Gendry, who is hiding as a blacksmith in King's Landing. Despite being encouraged to conceal his identity, Gendry reveals his parentage to Jon, and is allowed to join Jon in the journey beyond the Wall. Davos travels with Jon and his party to Eastwatch-by-the-Sea, staying at the castle while the others seek out a wight. Gendry returns in the evening, telling Davos that Jon and his allies are surrounded by the White Walkers and ordering a raven be sent to Dragonstone to request Daenerys's assistance. Daenerys arrives with her dragons to rescue Jon's allies, while Jon flees to Eastwatch on horseback. Davos joins Jon, Daenerys, and Sandor Clegane as they journey to King's Landing. There, they meet Queen Cersei, who is shocked by the wight captured by Jon. Cersei pledges her forces in the fight against the White Walkers, and Davos sails back to Winterfell with Jon, Daenerys, and their army.

Season 8 
After arriving at Winterfell, Davos, Tyrion, and Lord Varys discuss the implications of Jon and Daenerys' budding romantic relationship. As the White Walkers approach Winterfell, Davos spends time with Tyrion, Podrick Payne, Brienne of Tarth, Ser Jaime Lannister, and Tormund Giantsbane. Shortly thereafter, the Walkers' army arrives and Melisandre returns to aid the Northern forces with her fire magic. Before Davos can threaten to execute her, Melisandre tells him she will be dead before dawn. Davos survives the Battle of Winterfell, during which he helps command the Northern army. As dawn breaks, Davos watches as Melisandre removes her enchanted necklace and fades to bones in the snow. In the aftermath, Davos celebrates with the survivors and joins Jon when he marches the bulk of the remaining allied army to face Cersei.

In the final episode of the series Davos accompanies Jon into the devastated city of King's Landing, intervening in a futile attempt to prevent the execution of Lannister prisoners by Grey Worm and the Unsullied. He is last seen as a member of King Bran's Small Council, tasked with the rebuilding of fleets and forts.

References 

A Song of Ice and Fire characters
Fictional advisors
Fictional amputees
Fictional knights
Fictional lords and ladies
Fictional outlaws
Fictional revolutionaries
Fictional sailors
Fictional sea captains
Fictional smugglers
Fictional war veterans
Male characters in literature
Male characters in television
Literary characters introduced in 1998
Television characters introduced in 2012